Catherine McDermott is a Professor of Design at Kingston University in London, England.

In 2001, McDermott set up a masters programme titled "Curating Contemporary Design" with Paul Thompson, then director of the Design Museum in London and now director of the Cooper-Hewitt, National Design Museum in New York. Much of McDermott's personal research has focused on curating British design identity. She is the author of  books and articles on design history.

External links
 Kingston University web page

Year of birth missing (living people)
Living people
Academics of Kingston University